Otenis is a genus of longhorn beetles of the subfamily Lamiinae, containing the following species:

 Otenis chalybaea Heller, 1917
 Otenis epaphra Heller, 1917

References

Enicodini